Emmons Burdette Dunbar (March 24, 1882 – July 20, 1954) was an American agriculturalist and college football coach. He served as the head football coach at Maryland Agricultural College—now known as the University of Maryland, College Park—in 1901, compiling a record of 1–7.

Biography
Dunbar was born in Springville, New York, in 1882. As a youth, he was tutored by fellow Springville native and legendary coach Glenn "Pop" Warner in the intricacies of the unbalanced line used to great effect by the Carlisle Indians. In 1900, Dunbar enrolled in the Maryland Agricultural College, where he played on the football team as a guard from 1900 to 1902. The team elected him as captain in 1902, but he broke his leg in the second game against Mount Saint Joseph College. Dunbar graduated from the Maryland Agricultural College in 1903 with a Bachelor's Degree from the Agricultural Course. He married in 1910 and worked as an agronomist for the I. A. Corporation in Buffalo, New York. Dunbar was a member of the Freemasons.

Head coaching record

References

1882 births
1954 deaths
American football guards
Player-coaches
Maryland Terrapins football coaches
Maryland Terrapins football players
People from Springville, New York